The eleventh generation of the Ford Thunderbird (internally codenamed M205) is a two-seat convertible manufactured and marketed by Ford  for model years . It followed a five-year hiatus of the Thunderbird after the 1997 discontinuation of its tenth generation. 

Evoking the exterior styling of the earliest Thunderbirds, the eleventh generation features a removable hardtop with a prominent porthole window, power folding fabric top, and vinyl tonneau cover. Sharing mechanicals with the Lincoln LS and using Ford's DEW platform, it has a front-engine, rear-wheel-drive layout with a  V8 engine and a five-speed automatic transmission.

Part of a retro-styling trend in the late 1990s and early 2000s, the concept was introduced by Ford in 1999. The production model debuted two years later, winning the Motor Trend Car of the Year award for 2002. Despite this, the eleventh-generation Thunderbird never achieved its sales projections and was discontinued after 2005. After studying alternatives, including the closely related Lincoln MK9 concept, Ford declined to introduce subsequent generations of the Thunderbird.

The eleventh generation reach a production of just under 70,000 over four model years. Critics attributed the lackluster sales to poor marketing.

Background

The Ford Thunderbird was introduced in October 1954 for the 1955 model year as a two-seat roadster. Originally designed to compete with European sports cars and the Chevrolet Corvette, it marked the first time that Ford make sold two distinct model lines at the same time. The 1955 Thunderbird had advanced technology for its time, including such features as power seats and a padded dashboard. The Thunderbird was produced in ten consecutive generations until it was discontinued after the 1997 model year.

The 1997 introduction of the Volkswagen New Beetle sparked a renaissance of retro-styling in American automakers. Ford introduced a concept prototype for the eleventh-generation Thunderbird at the 1999 North American International Auto Show on January 3, 1999, 45 years after the debut of the original. Production models arrived in mid-2001 for model year 2002, more than two years after the concept.

Concept and production 
The concept featured a high-flow intake pipe, Gloss Red cam covers with carbon fiber coil covers, cam cover ‘Thunderbird’ script; carbon fiber radiator cover and integral supercharger air filters; power dome hood providing functional engine cooling; chrome trimmed surfaces on the hood's twin air extractors; revised chrome grille; larger chrome front fender intakes; revised, color-keyed rear view mirrors; revised front and rear bumpers; lowered suspension (1"); 18-inch tires on custom 16-spoke aluminum wheels; lockable two-piece hard tonneau cover; black convertible top; rear twin exhaust ports; rear backup lamps inset into the license plate housing; silver exterior paint; chamois interior. Ford sold the car to a private collector in 2010 and it was auctioned in 2014.

Production of the 2002 Thunderbird began June 5, 2001, with expected annual sales of 25,000. Initially dealers could charge well over MSRP and sold 31,368 the first year. Sales declined each year thereafter until its cancellation. 11,998 were sold in 2004. Ford announced in March 2005 that the Thunderbird would be discontinued in July of that year, with 9,548 sold for 2005.

Powertrain

Exterior

Design

According to  Jack Telnack, Ford's Vice President of Design (1980-1997), the Thunderbird design gestation was the longest of his career and was largely finalized before he retired from Ford in 1997. His successor, J Mays resolved "details, trim, fabric, the interior design and colors" and presenting the 2002 production model in 1999.

For the design, Telnack enlisted competing studios in Italy, England, Germany, California and Dearborn, bringing a 1955 and a 1957 Thunderbird to the Dearborn studio. In Dearborn, he asked each designer to literally wash the two cars, before taking pencil to paper. "I told them, I want you to rub your hands over the surfaces, understand the shapes, the forms that build the character lines, really get into it," he said. "You learn more by washing a car than standing there, looking at it."

The proposal from the Dearborn studio won, with the production model inspired by the 1955 Thunderbird. "If you look at the '55 in side elevations, you will notice that the car starts high in the front, reaching the high point over the front wheel and then tapers to the rear."

Other details recalling the original include the egg-crate grille, steeply raked chromed windshield surround, dropped hoodscoop and round taillights. J Mays would later describe the final design as minimalist, American, bold, and confident.

Before the design had been approved for production, the company presented a black, fiberglass-bodied Thunderbird prototype, with full red interior (including its entire dash) at the 1999 Detroit auto show, Pebble Beach Concours and Frankfurt Motor Show. The design shared its with the Lincoln LS and Jaguar S-Type, ultimately sharing its basic instrument-panel and center-stack layout with the LS.

In 2003, Valmet Automotive presented a retractable hardtop concept for the 11th generation Thunderbird at the Geneva Motor Show, featuring a fully automatic retractable roof with two glass panels, sharing the production model's storage capacity and trunk lid.

Color and trim
Styling remained unchanged over its production span, with exterior and interior colors changing annually. For 2002, the car was available in red ("torch red"), yellow ("inspiration yellow"), and turquoise ("Thunderbird blue"), all reminiscent of 1950s colors. Two-tone interiors (black and the color matching the exterior), were paired with these exterior colors.

White and black exteriors were also available in 2002, with matching solid-color interiors or the two-tone interiors were no longer available, with the exception of red and a limited white — in favor of all-black (or other one-color) interiors. Yellow and turquoise exteriors were no longer available, replaced by gray, sky blue and coral. Exterior and interior colors added for both the 2004 and 2005 model years remained subdued and white was replaced by silver.

Trim Levels 

Throughout its production run, the eleventh-generation Ford Thunderbird was available in two basic trim levels: Deluxe and Premium. All Thunderbirds included standard equipment such as perforated leather-trimmed seating surfaces, dual power-adjustable bucket seats, a leather-wrapped steering wheel, cruise control, dual-zone automatic climate control system with air conditioning, keyless entry, security alarm system, 17-inch tires and aluminum-alloy wheels, power-retractable cloth convertible roof (top), an AM/FM stereo radio with an in-dash 6-disc CD changer and a premium Audiophile sound system with dual amplifiers for the rear speakers, a driver message center, the HomeLink garage door opener system, a glass rear window with a defroster, and automatic delay on/off front headlamps. There were few differences between the two trim levels, with the Premium trim receiving chrome-clad aluminum-alloy wheels, and dual heated seats as standard equipment (the base Deluxe trim did not offer heated seats). The Premium trim also offered a 90-lb. removable hardtop roof, which could either be painted to match the exterior paint color of the vehicle, or painted in a contrasting color, and included two porthole windows, reminiscent of the windows fitted to some hardtops on 1950s-era Thunderbirds.

The Thunderbird also offered several different optional appearance packages that allowed Thunderbird buyers to personalize their vehicles. A Black Appearance Package added a high-gloss black accent to the leather-wrapped steering wheel and automatic transmission gear selector, while additional appearance packages added a Parchment cloth soft top (roof), color-keyed accents on the steering wheel and gear selector lever, and seat centers. These packages, which were dependent upon the exterior color selected (the Black Appearance Package was available regardless of exterior color), were only available on the Premium trim level of the Thunderbird. Other personalization options included the color of the removable hardtop roof, as well as a choice of several different 17-inch aluminum-alloy wheels.

Special editions 

2002 Neiman Marcus Edition:  In 2000, Ford introduced the Neiman Marcus edition in the company's Christmas catalog. With a production of 200 and MSRP of US$41,99, the edition featured two-tone black exterior paint color with silver hard top roof; logo etched into the circular hardtop glazing; scooped hood; twenty-one spoke chrome aluminum-alloy wheels; silver-accented steering wheel and transmission gear selector lever; aluminum dash inserts; perforated black leather-trimmed interior with silver wing-embroidered seat inserts; 'Neiman Marcus' embroidered floor mats and an available 1/18-scale die cast model.

2003 James Bond 007 Edition: Ford introduced the James Bond Edition as a co-branding promotion for the James Bond Die Another Day movie. With a production of 700, the edition featured coral paint with a white hardtop; twenty-one spoke chrome aluminum-alloy wheels, white perforated leather-trimmed interior, engine-turned interior trim panels with  "007" emblem, engine horsepower increased from 250 to 280, five-speed automatic transmission with manual gear selection; MSRP of US$43,995, and an available die cast scale model. Starting with Goldfinger in 1964 through Diamonds Are Forever, Ford had a product placement arrangement with the film's producer to exclusively use Ford products in the movies, a tradition that was restored with this movie.

2004 Pacific Coast Roadster Edition: The Pacific Coast Roadster edition, with 1,000 examples produced, featured monterey mist green paint with an ash metallic hard top roof and light ash soft top roof, paired with light ash and dark ash interior and suede trimmed seating, aluminum-alloy wheels, color-keyed interior accents, patterned dash trim, and a numbered dashboard plaque.

2005 50th Anniversary Cashmere Special Edition: In 2005, Ford celebrated the 50th anniversary of the Ford Thunderbird. All 2005 Thunderbirds received a "50th Anniversary" badge. The Cashmere edition, with a production run of 1,500, featured a commemorative dashboard plaque, cashmere exterior paint and medium gray soft top convertible roof; hard top; 50th Anniversary front fender emblems; teal-accented third rear brake lamp with illuminated "Thunderbird" script; two-tone gray and dark gray interior with Cashmere perforated leather-trimmed seating; color-keyed instrument cluster with turquoise gauge needles and "Ford Thunderbird" door sill plates round.

Reception and legacy
Forbes magazine writer Jerry Flint attributed the Thunderbird's demise to a lack of proper sales and marketing, writing: "Ford dealers have been successful selling $35,000-45,000 trucks, but have little experience selling automobiles in the near-luxury price range. If there was a marketing effort by Ford Motor, I wasn't aware of it. Naturally, sales didn't meet expectations."

Automotive journalist Doug DeMuro called the eleventh-generation Thunderbird a "Retro Failure", naming it "a lot of a disappointment" and noting that its initial warm reception had faded since its introduction. DeMuro primarily criticized the Thunderbird's similarity to the LS, interior, and price. With respect to the interior, he noted the apparent cheapness of the plastic used and the sharing of many switches with Ford's other models while admiring the retro styling of the door panels. He also criticized the engine, calling it lackluster and lacking sport. In his opinion, Ford made the 11th generation Thunderbird for people who were nostalgic for the first generations, not for a discerning buyer of a modern sports or luxury car, resulting in its poor sales. He ultimately rated the Thunderbird similarly to the Lincoln Town Car of the era in his "DougScore" metric, rating both somewhat below average and calling both geriatric.

Film and television

The 2003 Thunderbird was featured in the James Bond movie Die Another Day, driven by Halle Berry's character. In addition, a similar Thunderbird was featured in The Cat in the Hat

The 2004 live-action film Thunderbirds featured a heavily modified 11th generation Ford Thunderbird, a fully functional full-sized six-wheeled prototype called FAB 1.

Adriana La Cerva, Girlfriend and later fiancé to Christoper Moltisanti in the HBO series The Sopranos, drove a 2002 Ford Thunderbird in seasons 4 and 5

References

011
Rear-wheel-drive vehicles
Coupés
Convertibles
Retro-style automobiles
Motor vehicles manufactured in the United States
Cars introduced in 2002
Personal luxury cars